Lamar Ruff, known professionally as Prodigal Sunn, is an American rapper, actor & film producer. He is a member of Sunz of Man and Wu-Tang Clan original affiliate.

Biography 
Prodigal Sunn is an American Rapper, Actor, & Film Producer from Brooklyn, New York. 
During his youth, Prodigal was known as the 'Sun of Man' and was later re-christened to "Prodigal Sunn" by childhood friend Killah Priest in reference to the well known parable in Luke chapter 15, verse 32. Along with Hell Razah and 60 Second Assassin, they would form the first group associated with the Wu-Tang Clan known as Sunz of Man. Prior to the groups affiliation with Wu-Tang Clan they were known as  Arts of War & Da Last Future. They would go on to release two studio albums, The Last Shall Be First in 1998 and Saviors Day in 2002 (Prodigal served as the executive producer). The albums furthered the group's cause.
Prodigal Sunn is a man with the essence of the road running in his veins, growing up traveling back and forth between New York (Brooklyn) and The South. 

Prodigal built a reputation as one of the more socially conscious and lyrically deep artists associated with the Wu family. True to his restless spirit, he would cross the Atlantic and become an International sensation winning a Grammy Award in France for La Saga by IAM featuring Royal Fam & Prodigal Sunn and a VIVA Award in Germany for "Ich lebe für Hip Hop" by DJ Tomekk featuring GZA & Prodigal Sunn. He was one of the first artists approached by LRG Clothing for a sponsorship with numerous full page ads running in XXL, Source, URB and many more publications.

After of number of guest artist appearances and behind the scenes management, Prodigal launched his own entity, Godz Inc. He also entered into a venture with Free Agency Recordings to release music as chief executive officer of Godz Inc. Multimedia Solutions. His acting resume includes an appearance on HBO's Sex and the City, and he is a co-producer as well as a featured artist along with Jay-Z, Outkast and more in American Rap Stars, the longest running rap documentary ever on cable, now airing on The Movie Channel.

After seemingly a lifetime of criss-crossing the world, the country, classic albums, tours and all the experience that brings, the Prodigal Sunn, the 'Sun of Man' finally comes home to record his first solo album entitled Return of the Prodigal Sunn for Godz Inc./Free Agency Recordings, released in 2005.

In 2011, he released the mixtape Prodigal Sunn Meets DJ Premier.

In 2012, he had a guest feature on one of the most-watched reality TV shows in France, Les Anges, and released another mixtape, Hood Chronicles.

In 2017, Prodigal Sunn released his second album The Spark, which featured an amazing lineup of guest appearances including Wu-Tang Clan (Ghostface Killah, Masta Killa and Cappadonna), Sunz of Man (Hell Razah, Killah Priest and 60 Second Assassin), Killarmy (Dom Pachino and Shogun Assason), Brooklyn Zu (12 O'Clock), Black Knights (Crisis The Sharpshooter and The Rugged Monk), Makeba Mooncycle, Leggezin Fin, Shaka Amazulu The 7th and Big Twins of Infamous Mobb.

In 2018, in a joint effort between Sound Unity Entertainment and Sunn Entertainment Group, Prodigal Sunn released his third album “Redeemed” entirely produced by DJ B.Original. in 2019, Prodigal Sunn executive produced the third official Sunz of Man album The Rebirth.

Today in 2022, Prodigal is working with producer Nasiib from Germany & The Icon, Blue Weaver from the Legendary Bee Gees, who will be mixing and mastering the project.
The first single and music video, "Purple Noon", released 2020-which streamed over a 1.5 million streams up to date. 
July 7th 2022, Prodigal Sunn & NasIIB released there 2nd single, "All Praise Due". 
Prodigal & Nasiib are currently working in the studio &  carefully  taking there time with the project. Treating it like fine art to form a masterpiece! 
Words from Prodigal mouth "This Album will be a exclusive work of Art from the grains of raw hiphop".
Get ready!! The Saga continues..

Discography

Filmography 
 Thugs, the Musical, short film (2012), as Ketchup
 Director (2009) as Bull
 The Bait (2009) as Bassim
 Sex and the City (2000) as South Pole (TV episode "No Ifs, Ands or Butts")

References 

Year of birth missing (living people)
Living people
Wu-Tang Clan affiliates
Rappers from Brooklyn
Sunz of Man members
African-American rappers
20th-century American rappers
21st-century American rappers